The FIBT World Championships 1933 took place in Schreiberhau, Germany (now Szklarska Poręba, Poland) for the Two-man event. The Four-man event was not held.

Two man bobsleigh

Four man bobsleigh
Not held.

Medal table

References
2-Man bobsleigh World Champions
4-Man bobsleigh World Champions

1933
1933 in German sport
1933 in bobsleigh
International sports competitions hosted by Germany
Bobsleigh in Germany